Prince Moulay Rachid of Morocco, also known as Prince Moulay Rachid ben al-Hassan, (born ) is a member of the Alawi dynasty. He was the youngest male child of the late King Hassan II and his wife, Lalla Latifa Hammou. He holds a doctorate in international politics and serves Morocco as a diplomat, including attending the state funeral of Queen Elizabeth II. He is currently second in the line of succession to the Moroccan throne.

Early life and education
Prince Moulay Rachid is the second son and fifth child of King Hassan II and his wife, Lalla Latifa Hammou. Prince Moulay Rachid has one older brother, King Mohammed VI, and three sisters, Princess Lalla Meryem, Princess Lalla Asma and Princess Lalla Hasna.

After primary and secondary studies at the Royal College in Rabat and obtaining the Baccalauréat in June 1989, he entered Mohammed V University in Rabat to start his higher studies in law. In May 1993, Prince Moulay Rachid obtained his Bachelor of Law (LL.B.) majoring in economic and social law. The same year the Prince received his License to Practice Law – Public Law. On 29 June 1995, the Prince completed his graduate studies and received a Master of Law (LL.M.) in Political Science. The Bosnia question was the subject of his research and the thesis that the Prince presented and supported publicly. In order to complete his training for his postgraduate education, in November 1993, the Prince started an internship with the United Nations in New York. On 18 May 2001, the Prince presented his doctorate thesis on the Organisation of the Islamic Conference at the Université Montesquieu-Bordeaux IV, which merited a specific mention for the quality of his work. On 21 June 1996, the Prince successfully completed the written and oral tests for his postgraduate education and received a postgraduate Degree in International Relations.

As heir to the Moroccan throne
In 1999, after the death of his father and the enthronement of his brother King Mohammed VI, the prince became crown prince, but in 2003, this position was granted to his newborn nephew Moulay Hassan. The Prince is now second in line to the throne.

In 1999, a few analysts like Nicolas Beau and Catherine Graciet argued that Moulay Rachid might be better suited for the job of the king than his brother. They expressed their concern that Mohammed VI might not have adequate expertise to deal with militant Islamists.

Fouad Mourtada controversy
On 5 February 2008, Fouad Mourtada was arrested on suspicion of stealing the identity of Moulay Rachid by creating a fake profile on Facebook as a joke. Although the prince did not seek to press charges, on 23 February, Fouad Mourtada was sentenced to three years in jail and fined 10,000 dirhams (~US$1,350). After local protests and international criticism, Fouad Mourtada was granted a royal pardon on 19 March 2008 just days before an appeal hearing.

Personal life 
On 15 June 2014 he married, during the initial Moroccan wedding ceremony: the sadaq ceremony, his second cousin Oum Kalthum Boufarès (born 1987), who is daughter of Moulay El Mamoun Boufarès, former Minister of Interior, and paternal granddaughter of Lalla Khadija (a sister of Mohammed V). And on 13 and 14 November of the same year took place their zafaf (or celebration of marriage) at Dar al-Makhzen in Rabat. His wife, henceforth Lalla Oum Kalthum, was granted by King Mohammed VI the status of Royal Highness on June 8, 2017. Their first child, a son, Moulay Ahmed was born on 23 June 2016. The couple have two children, referred to as Highnesses. Moulay Rachid being second in line to the throne, his sons are respectively 3rd and 4th in line.

Children

 Prince Moulay Ahmed (born on );
 Prince Moulay Abdeslam (born ).
On 14 October 2022, Rachid tested positive for the COVID-19.

Activities 

On 20 September 2022, Rachid attended the Funeral of Queen Elizabeth II representing Morocco and his brother King Mohammed VI.

On 7 November 2022, Rachid attended the 2022 United Nations Climate Change Conference that took place in Sharm El Sheikh, Egypt representing Morocco and his brother King Mohammed VI.

On 20 December 2022, Moulay Rachid along King Mohammed VI and Crown Prince Moulay Hassan, received the members of the National football team, in the Throne Room at the Royal Palace in Rabat, after their brilliant performance in the 2022 FIFA World Cup.

Honours

National honours 

  : Grand Cordon of the Order of the Throne

Foreign honours 
 : Grand Cordon of the Order Al Khalifa.
  : Grand Cross of the Order of Leopold II (5 October 2004).
  : Grand Cross of the National Order of Independence  (2009).
  : Grand Cross of the National Order of Merit.
  : Knight Grand Cross of the Order of Merit of the Italian Republic (18 March 1997).
  : First Class of the Order of King Abdulaziz.
  : Grand Cross (Cruz) of the Order of the Aztec Eagle (11 February 2005).
  : First Class of the Order of Excellence (19 July 2003).
 : Grand Cross of the Military Order of Aviz (1998).
  : Grand Cross of the Order of Prince Henry (1993).
  : Grand Collar of the Order of Civil Merit (22 September 1989).
  : Grand Cordon of the Order of the Republic (31 May 2014).
  : Honorary Knight Grand Cross of the Royal Victorian Order (14 July 1987).

Ancestry

References

External links
 Hassan II Golf Trophy

1970 births
Living people
Moroccan princes
Royal Moroccan Navy officers
Moroccan businesspeople
People from Rabat
Alumni of the Collège Royal (Rabat)
Mohammed V University alumni
Moroccan generals
Recipients of the Grand Cross of the Order of Leopold II
Knights Grand Cross of the Order of Merit of the Italian Republic
Grand Cross of the Ordre national du Mérite
Honorary Knights Grand Cross of the Royal Victorian Order
Collars of the Order of Civil Merit
Sons of kings